

Eadberht (died between 787 and 789) was a medieval Bishop of London.

Eadberht was consecrated between 772 and 782. He died between 787 and 789.

Notes

Citations

References

External links
 

Bishops of London
8th-century deaths
Year of birth unknown
8th-century English bishops